Willard L. Kinzie (9 September 1919 – 25 November 2018) was a businessman and former mayor of Barrie, Ontario. After serving as an Alderman, Willard was elected as mayor of the then town and served at the time that it reincorporated as a city. He played a central role in many of the issues affecting Barrie, such as various annexation reviews and the development of the waterfront.  As a businessman, he ran a successful milk delivery business earning him the nickname 'The Milk Man'.

Background
Kinzie was raised in a farm neighbourhood, between Cambridge, Ontario and Kitchener, Ontario, during the Great Depression. With a shortage of work, he went overseas to work for government from 1942 to 1945. He used his earnings to begin his dairy career, which his father and uncles were also in.

Business career
In 1945 Kinzie purchased a small, one-route dairy in the Guelph area, which he sold in 1947. That same year he moved to Barrie and purchased Lakeview Dairy on Dunlop Street East which he continued to run until 1975.

Political career

Other major initiatives

References

External links

Mayors of Barrie
2018 deaths
1919 births